"In un giorno qualunque" (meaning "On an ordinary day" in Italian) is a single by Italian singer Marco Mengoni. The song was released as the third single from his second studio EP Re matto on 1 October 2010 and is also included on his first live album Re matto live. It was written by Piero Calabrese and Marco Mengoni. The song peaked at number 5 on the Italian Singles Chart. It was also certified platinum by the Federation of the Italian Music Industry for domestic downloads exceeding 30,000 units.

Music video
A music video to accompany the release of "In un giorno qualunque" was first released onto YouTube on 18 November 2010 at a total length of three minutes and fifty-one seconds.

Track listing

Chart performance

Release history

References

2010 singles
Marco Mengoni songs
Songs written by Marco Mengoni
2010 songs
Sony Music singles